Petrovo is a village in the municipality of Gevgelija, North Macedonia. It used to be part of the former municipality Miravci.

Demographics
According to the 2002 census, the village had a total of 206 inhabitants. Ethnic groups in the village include:

Macedonians 204
Serbs 1
Bosniaks 1

References

Villages in Gevgelija Municipality